Tere O'Connor (born 1958) is an American dancer, choreographer and educator.

Life and career
Tere O'Connor was born in Rochester, New York, and graduated in 1979 with a B.A. from State University of New York at Purchase. He performed in the companies of Rosalind Newman and Matthew Diamond, and began working as a choreographer in 1982. He regularly collaborates with composer James Baker in works for the Tere O'Connor Dance company. O'Connor's works have been performed internationally. Notable dancers and choreographers including Lucy Guerin have danced with his company.

From 1990-99, O'Connor was an instructor in Dance at Tisch School of the Arts, New York University, and he became a professor at the University of Illinois in Urbana-Champaign. He also teaches at Movement Research in New York City. Since 1989 he has been a member of the Artists Advisory Board of Danspace Project at St. Mark’s Church in New York City.

Honors and awards
2009 Creative Capital Award
2006 New York Foundation for the Arts BUILD Grant
2003, 2005, and 2006 Rockefeller Foundation Multi Arts Production Grant
2005 New York Dance and Performance Award
2001 Foundation for Contemporary Arts Grants to Artists Award 
National Endowment for the Arts Fellowships in Choreography
New York Foundation for the Arts Fellowships in Choreography
1999 New York Dance and Performance Award 
1993 Guggenheim Memorial Foundation Fellowship
1988 New York Dance and Performance Award

Works
Selected works include:

2001 Choke
1999 Hi Everybody!
1998 The World Is a Missing Girl
1998 House
1996 Mother
1995 Greta in the Ditch
1994 The Death of Generous Henry
1988 Heaven up North

References

External links
 Official site
 Tere O'Connor Dance RAMMED EARTH (excerpts)
 Archival footage of Tere O'Connor Dance performing O'Connor's Cover Boy in 2013 at Jacob’s Pillow Dance Festival.

1958 births
Living people
Modern dancers
Contemporary dance choreographers
Dance in New York City
State University of New York at Purchase alumni
National Endowment for the Arts Fellows
Tisch School of the Arts faculty
University of Illinois faculty
Bessie Award winners
American choreographers
Artists from Rochester, New York